Harry Robert Morton (May 19, 1934 – August 7, 2015) was an American politician of the Republican Party. He was a member of the Washington State Senate and House of Representatives, representing the 7th Legislative District.

Morton was a leader of the State of Lincoln secession movement, wherein the Eastern Washington and Panhandle of Idaho would become a 51st state. He also gave Cathy McMorris Rodgers her start in politics; first as his campaign manager, then as his legislative assistant, and finally creating the vacancy in the state House of Representatives when he ascended to the State Senate, which she filled via appointment. He died on August 7, 2015.

References

Republican Party Washington (state) state senators
Republican Party members of the Washington House of Representatives
1934 births
2015 deaths
People from Hornell, New York
People from Stevens County, Washington
Alfred University alumni
American Methodist clergy